Mindanao Avenue station (also known as Fairview station) is an under-construction Manila Metro Rail Transit (MRT) station situated on Line 7. It will be located along Regalado Highway in the barangay of Greater Lagro, Quezon City. It is adjacent to SM City Fairview, Fairview Terraces, and Robinsons Novaliches.

External links
 Proposed Mindanao Avenue MRT Station

Manila Metro Rail Transit System stations
Proposed railway stations in the Philippines